Bythinella is a genus of very small freshwater snails, an aquatic gastropod mollusk in the family Bythinellidae (according to the taxonomy of the Gastropoda by Bouchet & Rocroi, 2005).

These gonochoristic snails are small animals, with a shell length of about 2–4 mm. Amnicola is a close relative, containing North American snails with essentially similar appearance and ecology. The scientific name means "small Bithynia"; the latter snail genus is somewhat similar at a casual glance (though much larger) but not at all closely related among the Rissooidea.

Distribution 
The present genus occurs in springs, and sometimes caves or groundwater, from Catalonia across central Europe to the Aegean Region of Turkey. In and around France a particularly high diversity of these snails is found. Due to the limited range and special and easily  destroyed habitat, these snails are liable to become endangered species.

Species 
More than 80 species and subspecies are recognized at present. However, it is not at all clear that all of those recognized as good species are actually that distinct, and some in fact seem to be local morphs instead of valid taxa. Some undescribed species are also known to exist.

 Bythinella anatolica Yıldırım, Kebapçı & Bahadır Koca, 2015
 Bythinella aneliae Georgiev & Stoycheva, 2011
 Bythinella angelovi Glöer & Georgiev, 2011
 Bythinella anianensis (Paladilhe, 1870)
 Bythinella austriaca (Frauenfeld, 1856)
 Bythinella badensis
 Bythinella bavarica
  † Bythinella bearnensis Cossmann & Peyrot, 1918
 Bythinella bicarinata - synonyms: B. dunkeri, B. lalindei, B. moulinsii, B. poujolensis
 Bythinella blidariensis Glöer, 2013
 Bythinella bouldouyrensis Girardi, 2015
 Bythinella bouloti Girardi, Bichain & Wienin, 2002
 Bythinella calimanica Falniowski, Szarowska & Sirbu, 2009
 Bythinella calquierensis Girardi & Boeters, 2015
 Bythinella carcasonis Boeters & Falkner, 2008
 Bythinella carinulata
 Bythinella cebennensis (Dupuy, 1851) - synonym: B. anianensis)
 Bythinella charpentieri (Roth, 1855)
 Bythinella chinensis Liu & Zhang, 1979
 † Bythinella contemta Brusina, 1897
 † Bythinella cvijici Pavlović, 1935
 † Bythinella cyclothyra (Boettger, 1869)
 Bythinella cylindrica
 Bythinella dacica Grossu, 1946
 † Bythinella dalmatica Brusina, 1897
 Bythinella dedovi Glöer & Georgiev, 2011
 Bythinella dierckingi Glöer & Georgiev, 2011
 Bythinella dispersa Radoman, 1976
 Bythinella drimica Radoman, 1976
 Bythinella dromensis Boeters & Falkner, 2008
 Bythinella elenae Glöer & Georgiev, 2011
 † Bythinella elongata Roshka, 1973
 † Bythinella eugenii Jekelius, 1944
 Bythinella eurystoma (Paladilhe, 1870)
 Bythinella eutrepha (Paladilhe, 1867)
 † Bythinella falloti Degrange-Touzin, 1892
 Bythinella falniowskii Glöer, 2013
 Bythinella feheri Glöer, 2013
 Bythinella friderici Boeters & Falkner, 2008
 Bythinella galerae Girardi, Bichain & Wienin, 2002
 Bythinella georgievi Glöer, 2013
 Bythinella gibbosa (Moquin-Tandon, 1856)
 Bythinella gloeeri Georgiev, 2009
 Bythinella golemoensis Glöer & Mrkvicka, 2015
 Bythinella gregoi Glöer & Erőss, 2015
 Bythinella grossui Falniowski, Szarowska & Sirbu, 2009
 Bythinella guranensis (Paladilhe, 1870)
 Bythinella hansboetersi Glöer & Pešić, 2006
 Bythinella intermedia
 Bythinella istanbulensis Yıldırım, Kebapçı & Yüce, 2015
 Bythinella istoka Glöer & Pešić, 2014
 Bythinella izvorica Glöer & Georgiev, 2011
 Bythinella kapelana Radoman, 1976
 Bythinella kazdaghensis Odabaşi & Georgiev, 2014
 Bythinella kleptuzica Glöer & Georgiev, 2011
 Bythinella lancevelei Locard, 1894
 Bythinella luteola Radoman, 1976
 Bythinella magdalenae Yıldırım, Kebapçı & Bahadır Koca, 2015
 Bythinella magna Radoman, 1976
 Bythinella major (Pascal, 1873)
 Bythinella margritae Glöer & Georgiev, 2011
 Bythinella marici Glöer & Pešić, 2014
 Bythinella markovi Glöer & Georgiev, 2009
 † Bythinella megarensis Bukowski, 1896
 Bythinella melovskii Glöer & Slavevska-Stamenković, 2015
 Bythinella micherdzinskii Falniowski, 1980
 Bythinella molcsanyi H. Wagner, 1941
 Bythinella muranyii Glöer & Erőss, 2015
 Bythinella nipponica Mori, 1937
 Bythinella nonveilleri Glöer, 2008
 Bythinella occasiuncula Boeters & Falkner, 2001
 Bythinella opaca (Gallenstein, 1848)
 Bythinella pannonica
 Bythinella padiraci
 Bythinella parvula Locard, 1893
 Bythinella pesterica Glöer, 2008
 † Bythinella polita (Pavlović, 1927)
 Bythinella pupoides
 Bythinella radomani Falniowski, Szarowska & Sirbu, 2009
 Bythinella ravnogorica Glöer & Georgiev, 2009
 Bythinella rhodopensis Glöer & Georgiev, 2011
 Bythinella rilaensis Georgiev & Glöer, 2013
 Bythinella robiciana
  † Bythinella rothi (Brusina, 1884)
 Bythinella rouchi Boeters & Falkner, 2008
 Bythinella rouveyrolensis Girardi, 2015
 Bythinella rubiginosa (Boubee, 1833) - synonym: B. simoniana)
 Bythinella reyniesii - synonyms: B. compressa, B. parvula
 Bythinella samecana Clessin, 1911
 Bythinella schmidtii
  † Bythinella scitula Brusina, 1892
 Bythinella serborientalis Radoman, 1976
 Bythinella servainiana (Paladilhe, 1870)
 Bythinella sirbui Glöer, 2013
 Bythinella slaveyae Glöer & Georgiev, 2011
 Bythinella smolyanica Glöer & Georgiev, 2011
 Bythinella srednogorica Glöer & Georgiev, 2009
 Bythinella stoychevae Georgiev, 2011
 Bythinella syntriculus Boeters & Falkner, 2008
 Bythinella szarowskae Glöer, 2013
 Bythinella taraensis Glöer & Pešić, 2010
 Bythinella temelkovi Georgiev & Glöer, 2014
 Bythinella thermophila Glöer, Varga & Mrkvicka, 2015
 Bythinella turca (Radoman, 1976)
 Bythinella ullaensis Boeters & Falkner, 2008
 Bythinella valkanovi Glöer & Georgiev, 2011
 Bythinella vesontiana
 Bythinella utriculus (Paladilhe, 1874)
 Bythinella viridis (Poiret, 1801)
 Bythinella viseuiana Falniowski, Szarowska & Sirbu, 2009
 † Bythinella vitrellaeformis Lörenthey, 1902
 Bythinella walkeri Glöer & Georgiev, 2009
 Bythinella wantanensis Kang, 1983
 Bythinella wilkei Yıldırım, Kebapçı & Bahadır Koca, 2015
 Bythinella wufengensis Kang, 1983

 Bythinella sp. 'Dufort-Lacapelette'
 Bythinella sp. 'Padirac'
 Bythinella sp. 'Rogues'
 Bythinella bertrandi Bernasconi, 2000
 Bythinella jourdei Bernasconi, 2000

 Bythinella pujolensis Bernasconi, 2000
 Bythinella rondelaudi Bernasconi, 2000
 Bythinella troyana Bernasconi, 2000
 Bythinella vimperei Bernasconi, 2000
 Bythinella wawrzineki Bernasconi, 2002
 Bythinella geisserti Boeters & Falkner, 2003

Footnotes

References
  (2007): A gleam in the dark: Phylogenetic species delimitation in the confusing spring-snail genus Bythinella Moquin-Tandon, 1856 (Gastropoda: Rissooidea: Amnicolidae). Mol. Phylogenet. Evol. 45(3): 927–941.  PDF fulltext

External links 

 
Taxonomy articles created by Polbot
Gastropod genera